Dry is the debut studio album by the band PJ Harvey, fronted by English singer-songwriter and musician PJ Harvey, released on Too Pure Records on 30 March 1992. The album was recorded at The Icehouse, a local studio in Yeovil, United Kingdom. The first 5000 LPs and first 1000 CDs included demo versions of the album's tracks and Dry was subsequently released in the United States on Indigo Records in the US. Both versions were released in 1992. Dry was reissued on vinyl and CD in July 2020: an 11-track companion album collecting all of the demos titled Dry - Demos was also released on vinyl as a stand-alone record.

Background 
Speaking to Filter magazine in 2004, Harvey said of her debut album: "Dry is the first chance I ever had to make a record and I thought it would be my last. So, I put everything I had into it. It was a very extreme record. It was a great joy for me to be able to make it. I never thought I'd have that opportunity, so I felt like I had to get everything on it as well as I possibly could, because it was probably my only chance. It felt very extreme for that reason."

Reception

Critical response

Upon its release Dry received critical acclaim. In a nine-out-of-ten review for NME, critic Andrew Collins called the album a collection of "clever, repetitive, low-slung guitar poems" and said "Polly dredges these sounds from the pit of her dissected soul and drags them out of her mouth with clenched fists." Chicago Tribune reviewer Greg Kot referred to Dry as "jagged, lacerating and sexy in a disorienting sort of way" and likened the album to Broken English by Marianne Faithfull and Horses by Patti Smith; Kot awarded the album three-and-a-half-out-of-four stars, further stating "the best band out of the U.K. at the moment isn't another My Bloody Valentine guitar clone". Writing for Entertainment Weekly, Billy Wyman described Dry as a "scorching portrait of the dark side of the female psyche" and an "uncompromising work of exhilarating, cauterizing beauty", awarding it an A+ rating. Los Angeles Times reviewer Robert Hilburn gave Dry a three-and-a-half-out-of-four-star rating, writing that it "falls somewhere in between … an instant classic [and] a seductive calling card that signals the arrival of an extraordinary new artist." Critic Robert Christgau In his Village Voice column described Dry as a "cloudy but essential feminist distinction between egoist bullroar and honest irrational outpouring", rating the album an A−.

Retrospective reviews of Dry have also been largely positive. AllMusic editor Stephen Thomas Erlewine summarised the album as "a forceful collection of brutally emotional songs, highlighted by Harvey's deft lyricism and startling voice, as well as her trio's muscular sound" in a four-and-a-half-out-of-five-star review. Writing for Pitchfork, Laura Snapes said Dry "is a volcano and the scorched earth surrounding it, ripped with landsliding guitars, cowpunk mania, twisted blues, profound extremes, and power chords that hit like boulders dropped from on high." The fourth edition of The Rolling Stone Album Guide, published in 2004, awarded the album a three-and-a-half-out-of-five-star rating.

Commercial performance
Dry peaked on the UK Albums Chart at number 11, remaining on the chart for a total of five weeks. A month prior to the album's release, its second single, "Sheela-Na-Gig", had peaked at number 69 on the UK Singles Chart. Despite Drys critical success in the United States the album did not chart on any mainstream or independent Billboard chart, however, "Sheela-Na-Gig" peaked at number 9 on the Billboard Modern Rock Tracks chart in September 1992.

Dry was certified Silver by the British Phonographic Industry in March 2005 after shipments of 60,000 copies. According to Nielsen SoundScan, the album had sold 176,000 copies in the US as of December 2005.

Accolades
In 1992 Dry was featured in several publications' year-end best-of lists. It placed at number 12 in Selects list of the best albums of the year, number 18 in Spins "20 Best Albums of 1992" list, and was also featured in Qs "Recordings of the Year" feature.

Dry has since been featured on several best-of-all-time lists. It was ranked number 70 on Rolling Stones list of the "100 Best Debut Albums of All Time" and number 151 on NMEs "500 Greatest Albums of All Time" list. Dry is also included in the book 1001 Albums You Must Hear Before You Die.

Track listing

Personnel
All personnel credits adapted from Drys album notes.

PJ Harvey Trio
PJ Harvey – vocals, guitar, violin
Steve Vaughan – bass
Rob Ellis – drums, vocals, harmonium

Additional musicians
Ian Olliver – bass 
Ben Groenevelt – double bass 
Mike Paine – guitar 
Chas Dickie – cello 

Technical personnel
Head – production, engineering
PJ Harvey – production
Rob Ellis – production, mixing 
Mark Vernon – production 

Design personnel
Foothold – layout
Maria Mochnacz – photography

Charts

Certifications

References

External links

1992 debut albums
PJ Harvey albums
Too Pure albums
Blues rock albums by English artists